"Most of All" is a song by American singer Jody Watley from her 1987 eponymous debut studio album. It was released on April 18, 1988, as the fifth and final single from the Jody Watley album.

Background
"Most of All" was the least successful of the five singles released from the Jody Watley album. It peaked at number 60 on the US Billboard Hot 100 but did find success on the Dance Club Songs and Hot R&B/Hip-Hop Songs charts, where it reached numbers eight and eleven, respectively. The song was produced by Patrick Leonard and was co-written by Gardner Cole, both of whom had been involved with Madonna's 1986 album, True Blue.

The accompanying black and white music video for "Most of All" was directed by David Fincher.

Charts

Weekly charts

References

1988 singles
Jody Watley songs
Songs written by Patrick Leonard
Songs written by Gardner Cole
Music videos directed by David Fincher
1986 songs
MCA Records singles